The Lake Ridge Island Mounds (also known as the Wolf Mounds I-IV) are a group of small hills in Logan County, Ohio, United States that have been thought to be Native American mounds. State Route 368 passes a short distance to the east of the mounds, even weaving at one point to avoid them. A report produced in the 1970s observed that the mounds were in "excellent" condition at the time, never having been disturbed by artifact seekers.

An archeological survey of Logan County, published in 1914, revealed a cluster of mounds on the southeastern shore of Indian Lake, but no mounds on Lake Ridge Island were observed by the survey.  Typical of the mounds studied in the survey is the Dunns Pond Mound, located in the community of Moundwood a short distance south of Lake Ridge Island; it is significantly larger than the Lake Ridge Island Mounds.  The 1970s report highlighted the mounds as possible archeological sites, stating that they resembled small Hopewell mounds known elsewhere in Ohio and proposing that they were constructed by small groups of Hopewell who were isolated by time or distance from centers of Hopewell influence.  As small mounds, they were assessed as being potentially significant for revealing the origins and demise of the Hopewell in the midwestern United States.  For this reason, the mounds were listed on the National Register of Historic Places as a historic district in 1974, along with the Dunns Pond Mound; they are the only historic district in Logan County.  In nominating the mounds for listing, the Ohio Historical Society noted the mounds' location within Indian Lake State Park as being significant for archeological education: it was hoped that visitors to the park would become aware of the significance of the mounds and consequently seek to preserve archeological sites on their own properties.

See also
 List of Hopewell sites

References

Further reading
Koleszar, Stephen C.  An Archaeological Survey of Southwestern Ohio.  Columbus: Ohio Historical Society, 1970. 

Archaeological sites in Ohio
Archaeological sites on the National Register of Historic Places in Ohio
Historic districts on the National Register of Historic Places in Ohio
National Register of Historic Places in Logan County, Ohio
Mounds in Ohio